Mirsad Terzić (born 12 July 1983) is a Bosnian handball player for Wisła Płock and the Bosnian national team.

He is a left-back, but primarily known as a defender. While with Izviđač though, he scored 50 goals in only six games of the 2004–05 EHF Champions League season. Which made him the number three top scorer during the group stage. Terzić is also the most capped international and the all-time top scorer for the Bosnia and Herzegovina national team.

Honours
Izviđač
Handball Championship of Bosnia and Herzegovina: 2003–04, 2004–05

Veszprém
Nemzeti Bajnokság I: 2009–10, 2010–11, 2011–12, 2012–13, 2013–14, 2014–15, 2015–16, 2016–17, 2018–19

Magyar Kupa: 2009–10, 2010–11, 2011–12, 2012–13, 2013–14, 2014–15, 2015–16, 2016–17, 2017–18

EHF Champions League runner-up: 2014–15, 2015–16, 2018–19

SEHA League: 2014–15, 2015–16

References

External links

Player profile on MKB Veszprém KC

1983 births
Living people
People from Priboj
Bosniaks of Serbia
Bosnia and Herzegovina male handball players
Expatriate handball players
Bosnia and Herzegovina expatriate sportspeople in Croatia
Bosnia and Herzegovina expatriate sportspeople in Slovenia
Bosnia and Herzegovina expatriate sportspeople in Hungary
RK Zagreb players
Veszprém KC players
Wisła Płock (handball) players